James Rivers may refer to:
 James Rivers (politician), English politician
 James Rivers (surgeon), president of the Royal College of Surgeons in Ireland
 Jamie Rivers, Canadian ice hockey coach, executive and player
 Jamie Rivers (American football), American football linebacker

See also
 James River (disambiguation)